Larry Collins (born Lawrence Collins; October 4 1944) is an American Guitarist, best known for a variety of things including, being a part of The Collins Kids duo with his sister Lorrie, being mentored by Joe Maphis, and for his fast and energetic playing. 

When the Collins Kids split up in the 1960s, Collins continued to perform as a solo artist, and most notably co-wrote the 1972 hit "Delta Dawn".

Career 
Larry was a member of The Collins Kids, with his sister Lorrie (1942-2018). Their hits in the 1950s, included "Hop, Skip and Jump", "Beetle Bug Bop" and "Hoy Hoy". 

The Collins Kids became regular performers on Town Hall Party in 1954 and on the syndicated for television version of the show, Tex Ritter's Ranch Party, which ran from 1957 to 1959.

Larry and country star Joe Mathis (a mentor for Collins) recorded an album together for Columbia Records, titled Fire On The Strings, released in 1957.

The Collins siblings continued to perform together in the mid-1960s before splitting up. The duo reunited for a rockabilly revival concert in England in 1993 and performed together until Lorrie's death in 2018. 

When he was not apart of The Collins Kids, Larry went on to write and produce hits for many well known country music stars, and is most notable for co-writing the 1972 hit "Delta Dawn".  

Collins has continued to perform as a solo artist.

Equipment 
Collins is known for playing a double-neck Mosrite guitar like his mentor, Joe Maphis, a guitar he still performs with today.

References 

1944 births
Living people
American male television actors